Genowefa Nowaczyk-Błaszak (born July 22, 1957, in Książ Wielkopolski) is a former female track and field hurdler from Poland, who represented her native country at the 1988 Summer Olympics in Seoul, South Korea. She set her personal best (54.27) in the women's 400m hurdles event in 1985.

References
 

1957 births
Living people
Polish female hurdlers
Athletes (track and field) at the 1988 Summer Olympics
Olympic athletes of Poland
People from Śrem County
European Athletics Championships medalists
Sportspeople from Greater Poland Voivodeship